Sønderby railway halt is a former railway halt serving the southern part of the village of Tornby in Vendsyssel, Denmark. The halt was located on the Hirtshals Line between Hirtshals and Hjørring.

History 

The halt was opened in 1928, 3 years after the railway line opened. It was closed in 2019.

References

Notes

Bibliography

External links

 Nordjyske Jernbaner – Danish railway company operating in North Jutland Region
 Danske Jernbaner – website with information on railway history in Denmark
 Nordjyllands Jernbaner – website with information on railway history in North Jutland

Disused railway stations in Denmark
Railway stations opened in 1928
Railway stations closed in 2019
Railway stations in Denmark opened in the 20th century